Ueli Staub (1 January 1934 – 9 April 2012) was a Swiss vibraphonist, journalist, and photographer. Staub was the founder of the Metronome Quartet (later Metronome Quintet), along with Swiss pianist Martin Hugelshofer (born 13 July 1933, in Zürich), whom were both graduate students at the time.

Life 
Staub was a self-taught vibraphonist. He founded the Metronome Quartet with Martin Hugelshofer in 1953, which he played internationally from 1979–2001. He also played for the Robi Weber Quartet, Five Blazers, and Swiss All Stars. He also recorded an album with British saxophone and piano player Dennis Armitage (1928–2005). Staub married Margrit Staub-Hadorn in 1978, a Swiss TV announcer, presenter and author (1941–2007).

He also published two books (and was involved in one more):

 1978 - Tempi passati
 1994 - Portrait eines Jazz-Pioniers
 2003 - Jazzstadt Zürich (edited by Ueli Staub)

Staub also worked as a journalist, specifically for the Swiss Neue Zürcher Zeitung, about music.

Metronome Quintet 
In 1957, Swiss musician Bruno Spoerri (born 16 August 1935) joined the Metronome Quartet, which became Metronome Quintet, until 1975 when he left. His arrival marked a new era in the group, as even when he left another musician became a member, and so it always remained a quintet until its end in 2013. His arrival was also the beginning of the groups touring in Europe, and later in Japan in the Expo '70 in 1970.

Discography

Singles

Albums

Posthumous release (album) 

Discography here  available at discogs.com (31 August 2019)

References

External links 

 "Details zu Musiker: "Ueli Staub". www.jazzindex.ch. Retrieved 2019-08-31.

Swiss journalists
Swiss musicians
1934 births
2012 deaths